Sarita Rai is an Indian politician from the state of West Bengal. She was a member of the West Bengal Legislative Assembly from 2016 to 2021.

Constituency
Sarita Rai is a teacher of Nepali language at St George's School, Pedong. She represented the Kalimpong (Vidhan Sabha constituency) of West Bengal. Rai won the Kalimpong (Vidhan Sabha constituency) on a Gorkha Janmukti Morcha ticket. She beat the sitting member of the West Bengal Legislative Assembly Harka Bahadur Chettri by over 11000 votes.

Political party 
Sarita Rai is from Gorkha Janmukti Morcha.

References 

West Bengal MLAs 2016–2021
Living people
Women in West Bengal politics
21st-century Indian women politicians
21st-century Indian politicians
Year of birth missing (living people)
Gorkha Janmukti Morcha politicians
People from Kalimpong district
Indian Gorkhas
Rai people